Alliance Française Silicon Valley (AFSCV), is a non-profit organization from Silicon Valley, part of the franchise Alliance Française, which promotes the knowledge and appreciation of French and francophone cultures, encouraging the interaction among French, Francophone, and American people in the Bay Area through programs in education and the arts.

They have two centers, located in Los Gatos and Palo Alto, California, bringing their services to the Santa Clara, San Mateo and Santa Cruz counties. Their main office, foyer, and library are located at the Los Gatos center.

History 

Alliance Française Silicon Valley was created in 1970 in Saratoga by Mrs. Noble Tucker, under the name “Alliance Française of Saratoga.” It later became the “Alliance Française of Santa Clara Valley.” In 2013, its name changed to “Alliance Française Silicon Valley” to became easier to find.

Activities and Services

Language Classes 

AFSCV offers French lessons, grouping students by age (toddlers, children, teenagers, and adults), complementing the academic charge with cultural and festive activities all year round.

Something remarkable about this kind of institution is the origin of instructors. Board president Upi Struzak says: “We teach French, but our instructors are not limited to France, but also come from French-speaking countries. We have teachers from North Africa and Vietnam. France has influenced the Middle East, India, Southeast Asia and Africa.”

The institution evaluates the oral and writing skills by the Common European Framework of Reference for Languages (CEFR). In this way, it manages the levels when teaching classes. It also organizes teaching approaches for companies, and skills categories to improve.

Cultural Events 
The French alliance promotes the integration of French culture through exhibitions, Ciné-Club film screenings, appreciation of Francophone music, exhibition of works of art, performing arts, book club, special events according to ephemeris, free language practice through French Express, among others.

Remarkable acts for mention was the exhibition called “Pulsions”, February 13, 2019, in Jackson Square,  to the 836M gallery, presented an organized  by the Alliance Française Silicon Valley and the French consulate in San Francisco, to discover the works of eight French artists.

Past events have included a history of red soled shoes from Louis XIV to Christian Louboutin, a workshop on French Polynesia, Bastille Day, among others.

Approaches towards the COVID‑19 pandemic 
When schooling changed to online for most of the world due to strategies to contain the coronavirus pandemic, the Alliance Française chapters did the same with their French language classes and events. The result was mostly positive and actually increased participation in adult learning and gave online conversation and special events a creative boost.

The Alliance Française Silicon Valley (AFSCV) had online events and workshops included a series on hygiene – Le bain et la toilette à travers l’art – that was put on by a historian at the Louvre; a Netflix Emily in Paris discussion; art workshops around portraits, Pop Art and contemporary art and many others that proved to attract a large and geographically diverse audience. The 44 online events offered in 2020 were seen by participants all over the U.S. and Europe, including France, Holland, the Netherlands, Belgium and the U.K.

References

External links 
 https://www.afscv.org

Alliance Française
Franchises
Cultural centers
French-language education
Cultural promotion organizations